The Burleigh Brewing Company is a brewery and taphouse located in Burleigh Heads, Queensland, Australia.

History

Peta and Brennan Fielding started Burleigh Brewing in 2006. In 2015, they outgrew the original location and moved down the road to an expanded brewery and new tap house. 

On the back of a successful brewing endeavour in Hawaii, and bothered by the lack of balance, character or soul in Queensland’s beer landscape, in 2006 Peta and Brennan started brewing. Burleigh Brewing was born on 1 July 2006 and set about pioneering the craft beer movement on the Gold Coast.

Beers 
Burleigh Big Head (4.2%) No-Carb Lager
Burleigh Twisted Palm (4.2%) Tropical Pale Ale
Burleigh 28 (4.8%) California Pale Ale
Burleigh Fig Jam (7.0%) India Pale Ale
Burleigh My Wife's Bitter (4.8%) English Ale
Burleigh Black Giraffe (5.0%) Black Coffee Lager
Burleigh Blonde (5.0%) Bier Garden Lager
Burleigh Mid-Tide (3.0%) Ale

Awards 
In 2012, the HEF won the Gold Medal for 'South German-Style Hefeweizen/Hefeweissbier' at the Brewer's Association World Beer Cup.

In 2013, the Burleigh Brewing Company was named as the 2013 Telstra Queensland Business of the Year. In 2014 the company was named the 2014 Gold Coast Business Excellence Awards Supreme Winner.

Burleigh Big Head - World Beer Championships 2 x Silver medals
Burleigh Twisted Palm - World Beer Championships Gold and silver medals
Burleigh 28 - World Beer Championships 4 x Gold and 3 x Silver medals
Burleigh Fig Jam - World Beer Championships 5 x Gold medals
Burleigh My Wife's Bitter - World Beer Championships 2 x Gold medals
Burleigh Black Giraffe - World Beer Championships 4 x Gold medals

See also

Australian pub
Beer in Australia
List of breweries in Australia

References

External links 

Australian beer brands
Beer brewing companies based in Queensland
2006 establishments in Australia
Food and drink companies established in 2006
Tourist attractions on the Gold Coast, Queensland
Manufacturing companies based on the Gold Coast, Queensland